Cavalero (also named Cavelero) is a census-designated place (CDP) in Snohomish County, Washington, United States. The population was 4,660 at the 2010 census. Cavalero was created out of the former West Lake Stevens CDP in 2010.

History

Prior to its residential development in the 2000s, the Cavalero Hill area was proposed for the site of a large retail center similar to Frontier Village in Lake Stevens.

Geography 
Cavalero is located at  (47.984288, -122.075542).

According to the United States Census Bureau, the CDP has a total area of 1.639 square miles (4.24 km), of which, 1.638 square miles (4.24 km) of it is land and 0.001 square miles (0.003 km) of it (0.06%) is water.

References 

Census-designated places in Washington (state)
Census-designated places in Snohomish County, Washington